Florida Memorial University is a private historically black university in Miami Gardens, Florida. It is a member of the United Negro College Fund and historically related to Baptists although it claims a focus on broader Christianity.

History 
One of the oldest academic centers in Florida, the university was founded in 1879 as the Florida Baptist Institute in Live Oak, Florida. Soon after, the American Baptist Home Mission Society gave the school its full support, and the first regular school year began in 1880.

The Reverend J. L. A. Fish (1828–1890) was its first president. Despite a promising start, racial tensions soon cast a shadow over the institute. In April 1892, after unknown persons fired shots into one of the school's buildings, then-President Rev. Matthew Gilbert and other staff members fled Live Oak for Jacksonville, where they founded the Florida Baptist Academy in the basement of Bethel Baptist Church. They began holding classes in May 1892, with Sarah Ann Blocker as the main instructor. The school in Live Oak, however, continued to operate even after this splintering.

Nathan W. Collier, President of Florida Baptist Institute, and Sarah Ann Blocker, of Florida Baptist Academy, combined the two institutions to found Florida Normal and Technical Institute in 1896. Collier was president of the college from 1896 to 1941, and Blocker Dean of Women and vice-president from 1896 to 1944.

Brothers James Weldon Johnson and J. Rosamond Johnson (faculty member), wrote the words and music in 1900 to "Lift Ev'ry Voice and Sing" (known as the "Negro National Anthem") in 1900.

Florida Normal and Industrial Institute moved to St. Augustine in 1918 on a  tract of land, the site of the "Old Hanson Plantation", operated with the forced labor of enslaved African Americans. In 1941, the Live Oak and St. Augustine institutions merged, changing their limited offerings from a junior college classification to a four-year liberal arts institution which graduated its first four-year class in 1945. Author Zora Neale Hurston taught at the school in 1942, living in the upstairs of a two-story house at 791 West King Street, just east of the campus. 

The school's name was changed in 1950 to Florida Normal and Industrial Memorial College. In 1963, the charter was again amended to change the name to Florida Memorial College. Concerned by race-related violence in the city in relation to the civil rights movement (see St. Augustine movement), and feeling itself unwelcome in St. Augustine, in 1965 the college bought a tract of land in what was then rural Dade County.

In 1968, the college relocated to its present site (now "northwest Miami") and by 1972, it graduated its first class at the Miami site. Florida Memorial College celebrated its 100th anniversary in 1979 and began a series of expansion projects on the  campus.

In 1993 Dr. Albert E. Smith was appointed as the college's tenth president, heralding another period of growth. In December 2004, the institution's name was changed to Florida Memorial College, with the announcement being made at the Founders' Convocation in March 2005. On July 3, 2006, Dr. Karl S. Wright became the eleventh president. Dr. Roslyn Clark Artis was appointed interim President in 2013 and became the 13th president in 2014, becoming the first female President in the university's 138-year history. In 2017 she left to become the first female President in the 147-year history of Benedict College in Columbia, South Carolina.

It was in the Opa-locka North census-designated place, in an unincorporated area, until Miami Gardens incorporated as a city on May 13, 2003.

In 2006, Florida Memorial College changed its name to Florida Memorial University, a reflection of its expansion in graduate offerings.

Academics 
Florida Memorial University is accredited by the Southern Association of Colleges and Schools. It offers 41 undergraduate degree programs and four graduate degree programs through its eight academic divisions in six academic schools.  The business programs are accredited by the Association of Collegiate Business Schools and Programs. The social work program is accredited by the Council on Social Work Education. The Music Department is accredited by the National Association of Schools of Music (NASM).

The university has offered an honors program for 10 years that is designed to target and challenge students to their highest level.

The university also offers pre-college programs to reach out to the surrounding community. It addresses  critical urban needs and helps more than 700 youth through the Lion's Pre-College Experience Institute. The institute offers several programs that focus on academic achievement and higher learning, with an emphasis on physical fitness, dropout prevention, religion, financial management, entrepreneurship, and personal development.

Library
The Nathan W. Collier Library was named after Nathan White Collier, who served as the third president of Florida Baptist Academy for forty-five years. Dr. Collier was responsible for tireless fundraising and advocating; acquiring property and land; increasing enrollment and attracting nationally renowned faculty. Collier tried to replicate the educational aims and programs of Booker T. Washington. His greatest contribution was to the education and training of Black teachers throughout Florida. The Collier library houses 120,000 volumes, two Information Commons areas as well as separate Electronic, Teaching, Periodicals, Audiovisual and Group study rooms. The library subscribes to 30 databases, 519 periodicals and contains two special collections: The Rev. I. C. Mickins Theological and Sermonic Research, and the Dr. Laban Connor Black Collection.

Athletics 

The Florida Memorial athletic teams are called the Lions. The university is a member of the National Association of Intercollegiate Athletics (NAIA), primarily competing in the Sun Conference (formerly known as the Florida Sun Conference (FSC) until after the 2007–08 school year) since the 1990–91 academic year. Its football program began competing in the Mid-South Conference (MSC) from the 2020 to 2021 fall seasons.

Florida Memorial competes in 13 intercollegiate varsity sports: Men's sports include baseball, basketball, football, soccer and track & field; while women's sports include basketball, beach volleyball, flag football, soccer, softball, track & field and volleyball; and co-ed sports include cheerleading.

Football
The University played football under the name Florida Normal and Industrial Institute from 1946-58 (except 1949), competing in the Southeastern Athletic Conference. The Lions' record in those twelve seasons was 41 wins, 25 losses and six ties, with a 14–8 win over Albany State in their final game of 1958. The football program was re-instated in 2020, after a 62 year hiatus. The "new" Lions got their first victory on October 23, 2021, defeating Union College. 41–17.

Notable alumni

See also 

 Collier-Blocker Junior College

References

External links 
 
 Official athletics website

 
Universities and colleges in Miami-Dade County, Florida
Universities and colleges affiliated with the American Baptist Churches USA
Educational institutions established in 1879
Universities and colleges accredited by the Southern Association of Colleges and Schools
Miami Gardens, Florida
1879 establishments in Florida
Historically black universities and colleges in the United States
Education in St. Johns County, Florida
Education in Miami-Dade County, Florida
African-American history of Florida
Universities and colleges in Duval County, Florida
Education in Suwannee County, Florida
Private universities and colleges in Florida